John Michael Thresh (17 October 1930 – 12 February 2015) was a British plant pathologist, who played a key part in the battle against the cocoa swollen shoot virus in West Africa and the cassava mosaic virus pandemic in Uganda.

References

English botanists
British phytopathologists
1930 births
2015 deaths
People from Birstall, West Yorkshire
Academics of the University of Greenwich
20th-century British botanists